Elfrida Elementary School District 12 is a school in Cochise County, Arizona. It is a rural school located approximately one half hour north of the US/Mexico border and caters for K-8 students.

In 2002 the district had about 200 students. The district, as of 2002, receives students from the Rucker School District, which does not operate any schools.

References

External links
 

Public K–8 schools in Arizona
School districts in Cochise County, Arizona